Łyna  is a village in Nidzica County, Warmian-Masurian Voivodeship, in northern Poland. It is located in the historic region of Masuria. It has a population of 440.

The village is situated near the source of the Łyna River.

History
It was first mentioned on 12 March 1387. At least since 1540 until 1945, Łyna was the seat of a church parish. In 1600, the population of the village was solely Polish. In 1620, Polish Royal secretary Stefan Sadorski obtained 19 włókas of land in Łyna. Various Polish noble families lived in the village throughout centuries, incl. the Chmielewski, Krasiński, Michałowski and Węgierski families. In 1857, it had a population of 239.

The Battle of Tannenberg took place nearby in August 1914 during World War I.

Transport
The Polish S7 highway runs near Łyna, west of the village.

References

External links
Municipal webpage 
Photos and crest of pre-WWII Neidenburg 

Villages in Nidzica County